April Steiner Bennett (born April 22, 1980) is an American pole vaulter.

Personal life
Bennett was born in Mesa, Arizona, United States. She is a Latter-day Saint.In 2004 she won Season 5, Episode 14 of Fear Factor. August 25th 2008 She graduated from the University of Arkansas where she serves as a volunteer assistant coach. She was also a gym teacher at Hellstern Middle School in Springdale, Arkansas, and is currently an athletics coach at Woodland Junior High School in Fayetteville, Arkansas

In 2002, April was a competitor on Fear Factor.

As of 2021 Bennett was living in Fayetteville.

Sporting career
She was Jessie Graff's idol in university, and competitor at collegiate pole vault meets.

She won the silver medal at the 2007 Pan Am Games in pole vault representing USA.

She finished 8th at the 2008 Beijing Summer Olympics in pole vault represented USA.

Inspired by Jessie Graff's performance in American Ninja Warrior, she competed at the Los Angeles Qualifier, in the 2017 season 9 season opener. She competed with the nickname "Vault Chick".

References

External links
 Official website of April Steiner Bennett
 

1980 births
Living people
Sportspeople from Mesa, Arizona
American Latter Day Saints
American female pole vaulters
Athletes (track and field) at the 2008 Summer Olympics
Olympic track and field athletes of the United States
Arkansas Razorbacks women's track and field athletes
People from Springdale, Arkansas
Arkansas Razorbacks track and field coaches
American Ninja Warrior contestants
Pan American Games medalists in athletics (track and field)
Pan American Games silver medalists for the United States
Athletes (track and field) at the 2007 Pan American Games
Medalists at the 2007 Pan American Games